Three vessels of the French Navy have borne the name Hardi, the name being the French word for "daring":

  – launched in 1750 as the name ship of her class of 64-gun ships of the line.
Hardi – 1797–1799: gunboat
  – launched in 1794 as the name ship of her two-vessel class of 6-gun cutters. Sold 1803.

In addition, several French privateers have also borne the name, or a variant:

Hardi Mendicant was a French privateer cutter of Dunkirk that  captured on 15 February 1759.
Hardi was a French privateer, of Bayonne, that  captured on 15 March 1761 off Cape Finisterre. 
  was the French 18-gun privateer sloop Hardi that  captured on 1 April 1797. The Navy sold Hardi in 1800.
Hardi was a French privateer lugger from Cherbourg that the hired armed cutter Telemachus captured in July 1797 
Hardi was a privateer schooner from Guadeloupe, of four guns and 47 men, that the sloop  captured in 1798
HMS Hardi was the French privateer Hardi that  captured in 1800. She was broken up in 1809.

French Navy ship names